Santa Ifigenia is a town in the Honduran department of Ocotepeque (department).

External links
Satellite map at Maplandia.com
Site of Santa Ifigenia

Populated places in Honduras